Events during the year 1946 in  Northern Ireland.

Incumbents
 Governor - 	Earl Granville 
 Prime Minister - Basil Brooke

Events
19 March – British Royal Navy aircraft carrier  (laid down 1942) is launched at the Harland and Wolff shipyard in Belfast.
6 June – 1946 Down by-election: The Ulster Unionist Party gain Down in a by-election.
1 December – Nutts Corner opens as Northern Ireland's principal civil airport, replacing Belfast Harbour.
Homeless families from Derry begin to occupy the former United States Navy Springtown Camp.

Arts and literature
John Luke holds his first one-man exhibition, at the Belfast Museum and Art Gallery, and paints Northern Rhythm.

Births

January to June
9 February – Seán Neeson, Alliance Party of Northern Ireland politician
26 March – Carmel Hanna, SDLP MLA.
30 April – Fred Cobain, Ulster Unionist Party MLA
4 May – John Watson, racing car driver.
22 May –  George Best, footballer (died 2005).
25 May – Norah Beare, Ulster Unionist, later Democratic Unionist Party, politician.
21 June – Kate Hoey, Labour Party politician in the United Kingdom.
30 June – Allan Hunter, footballer.

July to December
31 October – Stephen Rea, actor.
28 November – Barry Devlin, bass-player with Horslips.
31 December – Bryan Hamilton, footballer and football manager.

Full date unknown
Maurice Harron, sculptor.
Inez McCormack, trade union leader (died 2013).
Tom McGurk, poet, journalist and broadcaster.
Freddie Scappaticci, accused of being a high-level double agent in the Provisional Irish Republican Army.
Raymond Snoddy, journalist and broadcaster.

See also
1946 in Scotland
1946 in Wales

References